Karen E. Taylor is the author of The Vampire Legacy Series of novels, published by Kensington Books. A voracious reader of vampire/horror novels, Karen first started writing Blood Secrets in January, 1988. She conceived of writing the novel while living across the street from a very large cemetery. It was never intended to be the first book of an ongoing series, but fans who had read the novel demanded a sequel.  To date, the series stands at seven titles, and has earned a cult following.  Her short stories have appeared in numerous anthologies, including: Love Bites, 100 Vicious Little Vampires, 100 Wicked Little Witches, A Horror Story A Day, and Seductive Spectres. In 2001, she was nominated for the Bram Stoker Award for best short story for "Mexican Moon".

Karen E. Taylor was born and raised in the Pittsburgh suburbs. A graduate of Churchill area High School and later of Grove City College, her first love was the theater, but now she admits that writing is better; "You get to write all the lines and play all the parts." She currently resides outside of Los Angeles with her husband and pets.

Bibliography

Collections
Fangs and Angel Wings - (Wildside Press 2003)

Bibliography
The Vampire Legacy Series
Blood Red Dawn - 2004
Resurrection - 2002
The Vampire Vivienne - 2001
Blood of my Blood - 2000
Blood Ties - 1995
Bitter Blood - 1994
Blood Secrets - 1994

Collections
Fangs and Angel Wings - (Wildside Press 2003)
NOVELS
The Vampire Legacy—Published by Pinnacle Books

Blood Secrets
             as HUNGER July 2011

Bitter Blood
            as HUNGER July 2011

Blood Ties
          as CRAVE October 2011

Blood of My Blood
                 as  CRAVE October 2011

The Vampire Vivienne
Resurrection
Blood Red Dawn
	
	

TWELVE STEPS FROM DARKNESS, Juno Books, April 2007

HUNGER, Kensington Books, July 2011

CRAVE, Kensington Books, October, 2011

SHORT FICTION

Fangs and Angel Wings
	

The short fiction of Karen E. Taylor''

"Gestation"	

Dark Fluidity
	

"Two's Company, Five's a Crowd"
	
Family Plots
	

 "A Good Idea at the Time"	

Women Writing Science Fiction as Men
	

 "Happy Mother's Day"  (with Barbara J. Ferrenz)
	
Brainbox II: Son of Brainbox
	

"Freedom"
	
Brainbox: The Real Horror
	

"Mexican Moon"
	
Daughter of Dangerous Dames
	

"Forever"
	
Horrors!: 365 Scary Stories
	

"Romeo Falling"
	
Return of the Dinosaurs
	

"The Presence"
	
Seductive Spectres
	

"Obsession"
	
No Other Tribute
	

"The Mirrored Image"
	
Love Bites
	

"VampWare"
	
100 Vicious Little Vampires
	
"The Blood of the Rose"

	
100 Wicked Little Witches

Book of Dead Things

Best of Horrorfind II
	
 Twilight Tales

See also
List of horror fiction authors

External links
Karen E. Taylor's Official Website
Karen E. Taylor's Official Blog

20th-century American novelists
21st-century American novelists
American horror writers
American fantasy writers
American women novelists
Grove City College alumni
Year of birth missing (living people)
Living people
Writers from Pittsburgh
Women science fiction and fantasy writers
Women horror writers
20th-century American women writers
21st-century American women writers
Novelists from Pennsylvania